Self-injury Awareness Day (SIAD) (also known as Self-Harm Awareness Day) is a grassroots annual global awareness event / campaign on March 1, where on this day, and in the weeks leading up to it and after, some people choose to be more open about their own self-harm, and awareness organizations make special efforts to raise awareness about self-harm and self-injury. Some people wear an orange awareness ribbon, write "LOVE" on their arms, draw a butterfly on their wrists in awareness of "the Butterfly Project" wristband or beaded bracelet to encourage awareness of self-harm. The goal of the people who observe SIAD is to break down the common stereotypes surrounding self-harm and to educate medical professionals about the condition.

Background 
Depression and self-harm often go hand-in-hand, though there are many other reasons people self-harm.  As many as two million Americans currently engage in self-harm, with methods like cutting, burning, scratching, bruising, and hitting themselves. It’s said that these behaviors promote feelings of control and help relieve tension, while helping the person express their emotions and escape the numbness that accompanies depression.

SIAD was created to spread awareness and understanding of self-injury, which is often misrepresented and misunderstood in the mainstream. Those who self-harm are often left feeling alone and afraid to reach out for help because they fear they will be seen as "crazy".

Participating organizations 
Organizations involved in SIAD include:
 Sociedad Internacional de Autolesión
 LifeSIGNS (Self-Injury Guidance & Network Support)
 Self-Injury Foundation
 YoungMinds
 ChildLine
The Mix
 Adolescent Self-Injury Foundation
 cars for hope

See also
 Mental health
 Self-harm
 List of awareness days
 World Suicide Prevention Day

References

March observances
Health awareness days
Disability observances
Self-harm